The Tucheng Station of the Taipei Metro is a station on the Bannan line located in Tucheng District, New Taipei, Taiwan. It will soon be a transfer station with the Wanda–Zhonghe–Shulin line in 2028.

Station layout

The two-level, underground station with an island platform configuration and has three exits. The station is located underneath Jincheng Rd. at its intersection with Heping Rd.

It will be a transfer station with the Wanda-Shulin Line, scheduled to open in 2028.

History
31 May 2006: Opened for service with the opening of the segment from Fuzhong to Yongning.
28 September 2018: Automatic platform gates were installed on Blue Line, as last batch of installation make all stations on Taipei Metro have a form of platform doors.
2028: The Wanda-Shulin Line became a transfer line.

Public art
Public art for the station consists of a faux archeological piece titled "The Legend of Gold Town". Produced through high-tech means, the piece is displayed similarly to how excavated artifacts are displayed. It depicts historical diversity and the development of the Tucheng area and represent the creativity and local characteristics of Tucheng.

Exits
Exit 1: Jincheng Rd. Sec. 1 
Exit 2: Intersection of Jincheng Rd. Sec. 1 and Heping Rd.
Exit 3: Jingcheng Rd. Sec. 1

Around the station
Parks
 Jincheng Park
 Tucheng Tung Blossom Park
 Zhanlongshanyizhi Cultural Park
Libraries
 Tucheng District Library
 New Taipei City Library Tucheng Branch
Schools and Universities
 De Lin Institute of Technology
 Tucheng Elementary School
Government Offices
 Tucheng District Office
Banks
 Hua Nan Commercial Bank, Ltd. (between this station and Yongning station)
Museums and Gallaries
 Tucheng Art Hall
Shopping Malls
 ASE WeMall
Hospitals
 New Taipei City Tucheng Hospital

References

Bannan line stations
Railway stations opened in 2006